Executive Order 13997, officially titled Improving and Expanding Access to Care and Treatments for COVID-19, was signed on January 21, 2021, and is the thirteenth executive order signed by U.S. President Joe Biden. The order works to ameliorate and increase access to COVID-19 care and treatment.

Provisions 
In consultation with the Director of the National Institute of Health, this order directs the Secretary of Health and Human Services to draw up a plan to support new studies to identify the most promising treatments for COVID-19 as well as future threats to public health, to develop a plan to promote research in rural hospitals, and to study its impact on patients' health for the long term. This order also directs the Secretary of Defense, the Secretary of Health and Human Services (HHS), and the Secretary of Veterans Affairs to offer urgent support and to set forth objectives for production, assignment, and distribution of COVID-19 treatments in critical and long-term care institutions. In addition, the ordinance instructs the HHS secretary to provide advice on how to enhance the capability of their health care workers to states and medical providers. Lastly, the order stipulates that the Secretary of the HHS should assess obstacles to maximizing the effective and fair application of COVID-19 treatments in order to promote successful COVID-19 insurance coverage, including the assessment of Medicare, Medicaid, and health insurance plans.

Effects 
The order will lead to new strategies for accelerating the development of COVID-19 treatments and improving access to high-quality, affordable healthcare by the HHS and the National Institutes of Health. Several federal ministries and agencies will deliver vital and long-term care services in a targeted way. The HHS will likely provide guidance on how states and healthcare providers may enhance the capacity of their healthcare workers. Finally, this order might lead to the government prioritizing investment in easily administered and extended treatment through research and development funding.

See also 
 List of executive actions by Joe Biden
2020 United States census

References

External links 
 US Presidential Actions
 Federal Register
Executive Order on Ensuring a Lawful and Accurate Enumeration and Apportionment Pursuant to the Decennial Census

2021 in American law
Executive orders of Joe Biden
January 2021 events in the United States